NBTC may refer to:
 National Border Targeting Centre
 National Broadcasting and Telecommunications Commission, a Thai regulatory agency
 National Building Trades Council
 New Brunswick Teachers' College
 Newport Beach Tennis Club